"Splash 1 (Now I'm Home)" is a 1966 single from the band 13th Floor Elevators from their album The Psychedelic Sounds of the 13th Floor Elevators. It was a minor regional hit in Texas but became a bigger (albeit still relatively minor) regional hit a year later when covered by the Clique. It has also been covered by Bongwater and The Mighty Lemon Drops.

Personnel
Roky Erickson: Vocals, rhythm guitar
Stacy Sutherland: lead guitar
Tommy Hall: amplified jug
Benny Thurman: bass 
John Ike Walton: drums, percussion

References

1966 singles
Radar Records singles
1966 songs
Songs written by Roky Erickson
The 13th Floor Elevators songs